Eleanor Jane Faulkner (born 5 January 1993) is an English competitive swimmer who represented Great Britain in the Olympic Games, and England in the Commonwealth Games.  At the 2012 Summer Olympics, she competed in the women's 800-metre freestyle, finishing in 22nd place overall in the heats, and not advancing to the final.

References

1993 births
Living people
British female swimmers
English female freestyle swimmers
Olympic swimmers of Great Britain
Swimmers at the 2010 Summer Youth Olympics
Swimmers at the 2012 Summer Olympics
Swimmers at the 2016 Summer Olympics
Commonwealth Games medallists in swimming
Commonwealth Games bronze medallists for England
European Aquatics Championships medalists in swimming
Sportspeople from Sheffield
Swimmers at the 2014 Commonwealth Games
Swimmers at the 2018 Commonwealth Games
20th-century English women
21st-century English women
Medallists at the 2014 Commonwealth Games
Medallists at the 2018 Commonwealth Games